The Sun Moon Lake Ropeway is a gondola lift in Yuchi Township, Nantou County, Taiwan.

History
The construction of the ropeway took around 18 months. On 14 December 2009, it passed the inspection of Nantou County Government. The soft opening of the ropeway to the public was done on 28 December 2009 and the official opening was carried out on 31 March 2010.

Geology
The ropeway runs through two Buji mountains with an altitude of 996 meters and 1,044 meters.

Stations
The ropeway consists of two stations, which are Sun Moon Lake Station and Formosan Aboriginal Culture Village Station.

Sun Moon Lake Station

The Sun Moon Lake Station is located at the edge of Sun Moon Lake. The station spans over an area of 3.74 hectares.

Formosan Aboriginal Culture Village Station

The Formosan Aboriginal Culture Village Station at the entrance of Formosan Aboriginal Culture Village.

Technical specifications
The ropeway consists of 16 supporting towers. It has a 1,877 meters of path length and 1,925 meters of total length. The gondola consists of red, yellow and blue colors, which represent the sun, moon and lake respectively. It has a total of 86 cars with maximum carrying capacity of 3,000 passengers per hour.

Safety features
The ropeway has self-propelled emergency vehicles in the event of an emergency. It is also equipped with high extension detection device to automatically adjust its cable tension.

References

External links

 

2009 establishments in Taiwan
Gondola lifts in Taiwan
Tourist attractions in Nantou County
Transport infrastructure completed in 2009